The Cheviot is a breed of white-faced sheep which gets its name from a range of hills in north Northumberland and the Scottish Borders. It is still common in this area of the United Kingdom, but also in northwest Scotland, Wales, Ireland and the southwest of England (especially Dartmoor and Exmoor), as well as more rarely in Australia, New Zealand, Norway (2%), and the United States. The Cheviot is a dual-purpose breed, being raised primarily for its wool and meat.

See also
 Border Cheviot
 Brecknock Hill Cheviot
 North Country Cheviot
 Western Hilly Cheviot
 Wicklow Cheviot

References

External links
Cheviot description as a rare breed in Australia
American Cheviot Society
The United Kingdom Cheviot Sheep Society
Cheviot Sheepbreeders' Association Australia

Sheep breeds originating in Scotland
Scottish Borders
Sheep breeds
Sheep breeds originating in England
Cheviot Hills